Panduranga Mahatyam is a 1957 Indian Telugu-language biographical film, based on the life of Pundarika, produced by N. Trivikrama Rao under the National Art Theatres banner and directed by Kamalakara Kameswara Rao. It stars N. T. Rama Rao, Anjali Devi and B. Saroja Devi (in her Telugu debut) with music composed by T. V. Raju. The film was dubbed into Tamil as  Annaiyum Pithavum Munnari Dheivam (1959) and it was again remade as the Telugu film Pandurangadu (2008).

Plot
Pundarika (N. T. Rama Rao) is from a pious Brahmin family, who is not interested in the worship of God and is irreligious, a complete rebel who is asked to mend the ways, he neglects his parents Jahnu Sarma (V. Nagayya), Lakshmi (Rushendramani) and wife Rama (Anjali Devi). He steals their gold for a prostitute Kalavathy (B. Saroja Devi), she takes all his wealth and throws him out. Not yet a changed man, the wandering Pundarik sets his sight on the three river goddesses Ganga, Yamuna, and Saraswati who is serving sage Kukkuta's ashram to get rid of the impurities passed on to them by the sinners who took a bath in their rivers. He also insults Kukkuta who is serving his parents at that time. When he tries to kick the sage, Pundarik loses his legs. Repentant, Pundarik crawls his way to find his parents and falls at their feet seeking pardon. He regains his limbs and prays to Lord Panduranga to grant him the boon of merging into him along with his parents — giving the message that one has to serve one's parents and it is the quickest way to Salvation.

Cast
N. T. Rama Rao as Pundarika
Anjali Devi as Rama
B. Saroja Devi as Kalavati
V. Nagayya as Jahnavi
Padmanabham as Hari
Govindarajula Subba Rao as Rama's father
Vangara as Panthulu
K. V. S. Sarma as Vritrasura and Sage Kukkuta (dual role)
Kasturi Siva Rao as Rangadasu
Balakrishna as Ramadasu
Peketi Sivaram as Kalavati's paramour
Rushyendramani as Lakshmi
Chhaya Devi as Suramma
Ammaji as Champa
Sowcar Janaki  as Rama's sister
Vijaya Nirmala as Lord Krishna

Soundtrack
Music was composed by T. V. Raju. Lyrics were written by Samudrala Jr. The songs Jaya Krishna Mukunda Murari, Amma Ani Pilichina are evergreen blockbusters. Lyrics for the Tamil dubbed version were penned by Kuyilan.

Release
It had a 100-day run in 9 centers and celebrated a silver jubilee in Vijayawada and Guntur centers.

Awards
 Nandamuri Taraka Ramarao won the Filmfare Best Actor Award (Telugu) (fourth in succession) for his portrayal of Pundarika.

References

External links
 

1957 films
1950s Telugu-language films
Indian black-and-white films
Hindu mythological films
Films directed by Kamalakara Kameswara Rao
Films scored by T. V. Raju